(born November 17, 1942) is a Japanese engineer and atmospheric scientist. He was the president of Kyoto University until August 2014, and then served as the president of RIKEN until March 2022. He is a member of the Japanese government's committee on space policy. He has a Doctorate in Engineering (1973, Kyoto University). He was born in Zhangjiakou, China.

His research has centered on plasma in the geomagnetosphere and cosmosphere. He developed the KEMPO (Kyoto university ElectroMagnetic Particle) code to reproduce the dynamics of the physical processes of space plasma. He led the plasma wave Geotail observations, and has helped elucidate mechanisms of excitation, such as electrostatic solitary waves. He has also worked on studies for the practical application of microwave power transmission in space.

Career

1967: Research assistant at Faculty of Engineering, Kyoto University 
1974: Assistant Professor of Faculty of Engineering, Kyoto University 
1981: Assistant Professor of Radio Atmospheric Science Center (RASC), Kyoto University 
1987: Professor of RASC, Kyoto University 
1992–1998: Director of RASC, Kyoto University
2000: Professor of Radio Science Center for Space and Atmosphere, Kyoto University 
2002: Director of Radio Science Center for Space and Atmosphere, Kyoto University
2004: Professor of Research Institute for Sustainable Humanosphere (RISH), Kyoto University
2005: Director of RISH, Kyoto University 
2005: Executive Vice-President (Research and Finance), Kyoto University
2006: Professor Emeritus, Kyoto University
2008–2014: President, Kyoto University
2015–2022: President, RIKEN

Organizations
1999 – Chairman of International Union of Radio Science (URSI)
1999 – Chairman of Society of Geomagnetism and Earth, Planetary and Space Sciences (SGEPSS)
1999 – Fellow of American Geophysical Union (AGU)
2003 – Fellow of the Institute of Electrical and Electronics Engineers (IEEEE)
2004 – Foreign honorary member of Royal Astronomical Society (RAS)
2005 – Fellow of the Institute of Electronics, Information and Communication Engineers (IEICE)

Bibliography

Prizes
 1975 – "Study of Whistler mode wave particle interaction over the magnetosphere plasma" was awarded the Tanaka-kan Award by the Japan Society of Geomagnetism and Earth, Planetary and Space Sciences 
 2006 – Awarded the Yuri Gagarin Medal from the Russian Federation of Cosmonautics
 2006 – Awarded the Minister of Education, Culture, Sports, Science and Science and Technology Award
 2007 – Awarded the Purple Ribbon Medal
 2008 – Awarded the 2008 Booker Gold Medal from the International Radio Science Union
 2021 – Awarded the Grand Cordon of the Order of the Sacred Treasure

References

External links
 
 Kyoto University profile
 Organization history, Research Institute for Sustainable Humanosphere  

1942 births
Japanese astrophysicists
Japanese aerospace engineers
Living people
Riken personnel
Presidents of Kyoto University
Kyoto University alumni